Brigitte Duda (born 2 March 1961) is an Austrian diver. She competed in the women's 10 metre platform event at the 1976 Summer Olympics.

References

1961 births
Living people
Austrian female divers
Olympic divers of Austria
Divers at the 1976 Summer Olympics
Divers from Vienna